The Poland–Slovakia border is the international border between Poland and Slovakia and has formally existed since 1 January 1993, following the dissolution of Czechoslovakia into two independent states. Before the dissolution of Czechoslovakia, its eastern border with Poland was practically identical to the present day border between Poland and Slovakia, with minor corrections made in later years. The length of the Poland–Slovakia border is

Course of the border
The border with Slovakia runs from Jaworzynka Trzycatek through the Zwardońska Pass, Wielka Racza, Wielki Rycea, the Glinka Pass, Pilsko, Babia Góra, Chyżne, crosses the Orava valley, the main ridge of the Tatra Mountains, runs along the Białka valley, along the Dunajec valley, through the Pieniny, the Poprad valley, through Muszyna, the Tylicka Pass, the Dukla Pass and the Łupków Pass, to the Uzhok pass.

History

When the Slovak Republic was established on March 14, 1939, under the auspices of Nazi Germany, the Czechoslovakia–Poland border ceased to exist. In its place appeared the first Czechia-Poland border for the Protectorate of Bohemia and Moravia, the Poland–Slovakia border, and a new Hungary–Poland border.

Polom ( m above sea level), south of the Jablunkov Pass, north of Czacy and Czarna, then through Wielka Racza, Pilsko, Babia Góra, Chyżne, crossed the Orava valley and the main ridge of the Tatras. Then it ran through the Białka valley along the Dunajec Valley, through the Pieniny Mountains, through the Poprad valley, through Muszynę and ended its course at the top of Czernin (Černina) ( m above sea level) in the vicinity of Łupków, where the tripartite borders of the Second Polish Republic, the Slovak Republic and the Kingdom of Hungary were located. The Poland–Slovakia border survived in fact until 28 September 1939, when it became the Nazi Germany–Soviet Union border, and formally until 1958, because only on June 13, 1958, the governments of the Polish People's Republic and the Czechoslovak Socialist Republic signed an agreement solving border disputes.

2005 adjustment
Pursuant to an agreement between the Republic of Poland and the Slovak Republic drawn up in Lubovla on 29 July 2002 and ratified on 17 October 2005,
Near the observation tower on the Dukla Pass in the area of the Polish town of Barwinek and the Slovakian town of Vyšný Komárnik, Slovakia gave up  of territory, and Poland handed over territory of the same area (the change was dictated by the inability to restore the common border road to its previous state; built in 1958 to allow Slovak tourists to see the places of fighting. After correction, the border runs the middle of the road) on the Dunajec river in the vicinity of the Polish towns Sromowce Niżne and Sromowce Wyżne and the Slovak towns of Červený Kláštor and Spišská Stará Ves, part of the unnamed island with an area of  surrendered to Slovakia, and Slovakia gave way to part of the island of Nokiel with the same area (the change was dictated by the lack of possibility to settle border marks in the right places, due to the shape change of the island).

See also
 Territorial changes of Poland 
 Border Guard (Poland)
 Extreme points of Poland
 Geography of Poland
 Poland-Slovakia relations
 Polish border crossings
 Polish rail border crossings

References

 
European Union internal borders
Borders of Poland
Borders of Slovakia
International borders